Volcher Coiter (also spelled Coyter or Koyter; 1534 – 2 June 1576) was a Dutch anatomist who established the study of comparative osteology and first described cerebrospinal meningitis.

Biography

Coiter was born in Groningen. He studied in Italy and France and was a pupil of Ulisse Aldrovandi, Gabriele Falloppio, Bartolomeo Eustachi and Guillaume Rondelet. He became city physician of Nuremberg in 1569. He took part in the French Wars of Religion as field surgeon to Count Palatine Johann Casimir. He died in Champagne during the German forces' return march.
 
His works included Externarum et Internarum Principalium Humani Corporis Partium Tabulae (1572) and De Avium Sceletis et Praecipius Musculis (1575). His work included detailed anatomical studies of birds as well as a classification of the birds based on structure and habits. He produced an early dichotomous classification key.

References

Further reading
Stresemann, Erwin (1975). Ornithology from Aristotle to the Present. Harvard University Press. .

External links
 

1534 births
1576 deaths
Dutch anatomists
Physicians of the Habsburg Netherlands
Dutch ornithologists
Scientists from Groningen (city)